Douglas Marvin Dumler is a former professional American football player who played offensive lineman for five seasons for the New England Patriots and Minnesota Vikings. After his NFL career, he obtained his Juris Doctor from Suffolk Law School and is an attorney in Fort Collins, Colorado where he practices estate planning with Haltzman Law Firm, P.C.

References

1950 births
American football offensive guards
American football centers
New England Patriots players
Minnesota Vikings players
Nebraska Cornhuskers football players
Living people
People from Hoisington, Kansas
Suffolk University Law School alumni
University of Nebraska alumni